Amanda Blair (born 1968) is an Australian radio broadcaster, a former columnist with the Sunday Mail, and a former member of the Social Inclusion Board.

She started her radio career in Melbourne in 1996 when she made an appearance on the Richard Stubbs Breakfast Show on Triple M to promote her book The Essential Pauline Hanson. She was signed with Austereo, and moved to Adelaide to co-host the breakfast show on SAFM with Paul Gale and James Brayshaw in March 1998. The show attained top position in the market by the end of that year and maintained it until the show ended in July 2003.

She produced an event, Comedy for a Cause, as part of the Adelaide Fringe in 2004, 2006 and 2008, which raised significant money for homeless charities, and was a board member of the Adelaide Festival of Arts from 2004.

In 2007, after a three-year break from radio, she began work at 5AA, hosting the afternoon program. She resigned from 5AA in May 2012 to spend more time with her family, with her last show being on 8 June. In 2022, she revealed that she has a foster child, Jayden.

References

External links
Amanda Blair's page at FIVEaa

Living people
1968 births
People from Adelaide
Australian radio personalities
Australian women radio presenters
Australian women journalists
Journalists from South Australia